The Scheibe Zugvogel is a West German, high-wing, single-seat, FAI Open Class glider that was produced by Scheibe Flugzeugbau. The first version was designed by Rudolph Kaiser and subsequent versions by Egon Scheibe.

Design and development
The Zugvogel was designed with the goal of a simple and inexpensive, but high performance, open class competition glider, with quick assembly. It was developed through several variants before production ended after 100 had been completed.

The aircraft is of mixed construction, with a welded steel tube fuselage covered in doped aircraft fabric covering, wooden framed tail surfaces covered in fabric and wooden wings. The  span wing uses a NACA 63-616 airfoil at the wing root, changing to a NACA 63-614 section at the wing tip. The wing uses dive brakes for glidepath control. The nose is covered with fibreglass. The landing gear is a fixed monowheel.

The Zugvogel IIIB was type certified in the United States on 6 May 1964. Zugvogel IIIAs operated in the US are in the Experimental - Racing/Exhibition category.

Operational history
US glider pilot Helen Dick set a number of US national feminine single-place records in her Zugvogel IIIB between 1964 and 1967.

In July 2011 there were three Zugvogel IIIAs and two IIIBs registered with the US Federal Aviation Administration and two Zugvogel IIIAs and four  IIIBs registered with the British Civil Aviation Authority.

Variants
Zugvogel I
Initial version
Zugvogel II
Improved version
Zugvogel III
Improved version
Zugvogel IIIA
 wingspan, 37.8:1 glide ratio.
Zugvogel IIIB
Similar to the IIIA, but with a shallower fuselage.
Zugvogel IV
Zugvogel IVA
Scheibe SF-27 Zugvogel V
FAI Standard Class development
Loravia LCA-10 Topaze
Loravia LCA-11 Topaze

Aircraft on display

Deutsches Segelflugmuseum

Specifications (Zugvogel IIIA)

See also

References

External links

1950s German sailplanes
Zugvogel
Glider aircraft
Aircraft first flown in 1954